The 2017–18 South Alabama Jaguars women's basketball team represented the University of South Alabama during the 2017–18 NCAA Division I women's basketball season. The Jaguars were led by fifth year head coach Terry Fowler and played their home games at the Mitchell Center as members in the Sun Belt Conference. They finished the season 21–13, 11–7 in Sun Belt play to finish in fifth place. They advanced to the second round of the Sun Belt women's tournament where they lost to Troy. They accepted a bid to the Women's Basketball Invitational and advanced to the semifinals but lost to Yale in overtime.

Previous season
They finished the season 11–20, 5–13 in Sun Belt play to finish in tenth place. They advanced to the quarterfinals of the Sun Belt women's tournament where they lost to Texas–Arlington.

Roster

Schedule

|-
!colspan=9 style=| Exhibition

|-
!colspan=9 style=| Non-conference regular season

|-
!colspan=9 style=| Sun Belt regular season

|-
!colspan=9 style=| Sun Belt Women's Tournament

|-
!colspan=9 style=| WBI

Rankings
2017–18 NCAA Division I women's basketball rankings

See also
 2017–18 South Alabama Jaguars men's basketball team

References

External links

South Alabama Jaguars women's basketball seasons
South Alabama
South Alabama